Herman Meyer Bosman (born 19 April 1985) is a South African former professional rugby player, who last played for the Stade Français, in France. He is a flyhalf (10), but has recently showed great ability in the inside-center position. He has played for the national team of South Africa, the Springboks on 3 occasions in test matches between 2005 and 2006. He played his last test to date on 15 July 2006 against  in Brisbane. Throughout his career, Bosman won three Currie Cup trophies, two outright and drawing another in 2006, also finishing as runner-up twice with the Sharks.

Rugby career

Cheetahs / Free State Cheetahs

The result meant the Free State Cheetahs won only their second Currie Cup championship, the first being more than 30 years previously.

Bosman was part of the team that successfully defended the title for the following two years, the final ending in a 28–28 draw in 2006 against  and then defeating the Golden Lions 20–18 in the 2007 final.

In 2006 the  entered the Super 14 as the new South African franchise. At the time of his departure, Bosman held Cheetahs Super Rugby records for career appearances (61), most career points (188), most points in a Super Rugby match (26) and most penalty goals in a Super Rugby match (8).

Springboks

At the young age of 20, he made his debut for the Boks in late 2005, against Wales in Cardiff. The Boks won the game 33–16, with Bosman contributed two conversions on his debut. He played the next week against France in Paris, again starting at flyhalf. He kicked one penalty goal in the 20–26 loss. After the Cheetahs' Super 14 season in 2006 ended, Bosman was called up for the Boks for the Tri Nations, and was a reserve in the 0–49 loss in Brisbane against the Wallabies.

Sharks / Sharks

The former Sharks inside center, Andries Strauss, played in that match for the Cheetahs, the two players effectively swapping the number 12 jerseys for the two teams. Bosman was a regular starter for the Sharks throughout his career as he helped steer the coastal side to two consecutive Currie Cup finals (in 2011 and 2012) and a Super Rugby qualifier (2011) and final (2012). However, Bosman never managed to win a title with the side.

Stade Francais

In 2013, Stade Français announced that he was joining them on a two-year contract.

Honours

 2005 Currie Cup Premier Division – 
 2006 Currie Cup Premier Division – 
 2007 Currie Cup Premier Division –

References

External links
Sharks profile
Cheetahs profile
Springbok Rugby Hall of Fame
itsrugby.co.uk

1985 births
Living people
People from Bethlehem, Free State
Afrikaner people
South African rugby union players
South Africa international rugby union players
Cheetahs (rugby union) players
Free State Cheetahs players
Sharks (Currie Cup) players
Sharks (rugby union) players
Rugby union centres
Rugby union players from the Free State (province)